Northern International Medical College is a medical school in Dhaka, Bangladesh, affiliated with University of Dhaka and approved by Bangladesh Medical and Dental Council (BMDC). It was established in 2005.

References

External links

Medical colleges in Bangladesh
Universities and colleges in Dhaka
Educational institutions established in 2005
2005 establishments in Bangladesh